Wang Yu (born 28 April 2002) is a Chinese professional footballer who plays as a midfielder for Chinese side Dalian Pro.

Club career
Wang Yu joined Beijing Wanda and went to Atlético Madrid for youth training in 2015. On his return to China he would join Wanda Group owned Dalian Yifang's youth team in 2019. He would go on to represent both their U-17 and U-19 youth team. In July 2021, Wang was promoted to the first team squad (now known as Dalian Pro), and he would go on to make his debut on 31 July 2021 in a league game against Beijing Guoan that ended in a 1-0 defeat.

Career statistics

References

External links
 

2002 births
Living people
Chinese footballers
Association football midfielders
Dalian Professional F.C. players
Chinese Super League players
Chinese expatriate footballers
Chinese expatriate sportspeople in Spain
Expatriate footballers in Spain
Footballers from Dalian